Splendrillia kapuranga is a species of sea snail, a marine gastropod mollusk in the family Drilliidae.

Description
The length of the shell attains 17 mm, its diameter 5.5 mm.

Distribution
This marine species is endemic to New Zealand and occurs off the Chatham Rise, east of South Island at a depth of 550 m.

References

 Dell, R. K. "A molluscan fauna from the Chatham Rise, New Zealand." Records of the Dominion Museum 2.1 (1953): 37–50.
 Powell, A.W.B. 1979: New Zealand Mollusca: Marine, Land and Freshwater Shells, Collins, Auckland

External links
 Spencer H.G., Willan R.C., Marshall B.A. & Murray T.J. (2011). Checklist of the Recent Mollusca Recorded from the New Zealand Exclusive Economic Zone
  Tucker, J.K. 2004 Catalog of recent and fossil turrids (Mollusca: Gastropoda). Zootaxa 682:1-1295.
 

kapuranga
Gastropods of New Zealand
Gastropods described in 1953